White Death may refer to:

Arts and entertainment
White Death (novel), a 2003 book by Clive Cussler and Paul Kemprecos
White Death (film), a 1936 Australian film starring Zane Grey as himself
The White Death (film), a 1921 German silent drama film
White Death (video game), a 1989 video game based on the board game of the same name
Sugar — White Death,  an avant-folk band from Kyiv, Ukraine
The White Death, an album by Fleurety
 "White Death", a song by Sabaton from Coat of Arms
 "White Death", English translation for "Belaja smert", a song by KYPCK from Zero

People
Nikephoros II Phokas (c. 912–969), Byzantine emperor and general, known in the Muslim world as "White Death of the Saracens"
Simo Häyhä (1905–2002), Finnish sniper in the Winter War, nicknamed "White Death" by the Red army

See also
White plague (disambiguation)